Kiko Boksingero is a 2017 Philippine independent film starring Noel Comia Jr., and directed by Thop Nazareno. It won the awards for Best Actor (Noel Comia Jr.), Best Supporting Actress (Yayo Aguila),and Best Original Music Score (Pepe Manikan) at the 2017 Cinemalaya Film Festival.

See also 
13th Cinemalaya Independent Film Festival
Respeto

References

External links 
 

2017 films
Philippine independent films
Philippine New Wave
2010s Tagalog-language films
2017 independent films